Álvaro Alberto Saborío Chacón (born 25 March 1982) is a Costa Rican professional footballer, who plays as a forward and captains Costa Rican club San Carlos from the Primera División de Costa Rica. Saborío originally retired in 2017, but returned months later.

A full international for Costa Rica since 2002, Saborío has over 110 caps and 36 goals for the nation, whom he represented at five CONCACAF Gold Cups, in addition to one tournament each at the Olympics, FIFA World Cup, and Copa América.

Club career
Saborío is a product of C.F. Monterrey's youth system. He played with the club's reserve team in the Segunda División de México and with affiliate Coyotes de Saltillo in the Primera A.

Deportivo Saprissa
Saborio began his professional career with Saprissa in his native Costa Rica. He made his Costa Rican Primera División debut against Limonense on 8 August 2001. Saborío was the leading goal-scorer of the 2003–2004 Costa Rican season, finishing the year with 25 goals, five above Whayne Wilson.

With Saprissa, he has won a league title and a CONCACAF Champions Cup, and was part of the team that played the 2005 FIFA Club World Championship Toyota Cup, where Saprissa finished third behind São Paulo and Liverpool. At the tournament, he scored two goals and ended up tied with three other players for top scoring honors.

FC Sion
He moved to Swiss Super League outfit FC Sion after playing for Costa Rica at the 2006 World Cup. He formed a good partnership at FC Sion with Poland's Zbigniew Zakrzewski.

His performances in Switzerland reportedly caught the eye of Stoke City's manager Tony Pulis who aimed to sign him in the summer of 2009, however he instead joined Bristol City on loan.

Bristol City
Saborío played his first game for Bristol City in a Championship match on 13 September against Coventry City making an impact by setting up fellow striker Nicky Maynard. Saborío also picked up his first yellow card in English football as the match ended in a 1–1 draw. Saborio scored his first goal for Bristol City in their 1–1 draw with Scunthorpe United.

He left Bristol City and his contract was terminated with FC Sion in February 2010 so that he could return to Costa Rica.

Real Salt Lake

Saborío signed with Major League Soccer club Real Salt Lake in March 2010. He made a huge impact in his first season in Salt Lake: RSL boasted the highest-scoring offense in MLS in 2010 (45 goals); Saborío led the way with a team-high 12 tallies. For his efforts, he earned the MLS Newcomer of the Year award. He also starred for the club in the CONCACAF Champions League tournament, scoring eight goals as Real Salt Lake advanced to the championship round.

After a successful first season at the club, Saborío was made Salt Lake's first ever Designated Player, signing a four-year contract with the club on 1 December 2010.

Saborío became the club's all-time leading scorer, and their key target man. As of 5 May 2012, Saborío had scored 38 goals across all competitions, eight of them coming from CONCACAF Champions League play.

On 18 November 2013 Saborío was named FutbolMLS.com's Latino del Año.

Saborío scored a goal in the 52nd minute of the 2013 MLS Cup on 7 December. His goal was equalized by Aurélien Collin in the 76th minute. He later missed his penalty kick when the game went into a penalty kick shoutout, in which Sporting Kansas City won.

D.C. United
On 16 July 2015, Saborío was traded to D.C. United for Luis Silva. He scored his first goal for United on 26 July 2015, against the Philadelphia Union. On 2 October 2015, Saborío scored a stoppage time winner against New York City FC to clinch United a spot in the 2015 MLS Playoffs.

Saborío re-signed with United on 17 November 2015.

On 14 November 2016, Saborío announced that he was to leave United after two seasons. He played 31 games, scored 10 goals, and contributed 10 assists for D.C. United.

Deportivo Saprissa
On 10 January 2017, Saborío signed a one-year contract with Deportivo Saprissa. On 9 February 2017, Saborío announced his retirement due to conflicts with Saprissa fans.

San Carlos
Saborío was a leading figure in San Carlos' double championship: first in the second division, and once in the first division, they won the Torneo de Clausura for the 2018-2019 season.

International career
Saborío was an important player for the Costa Rica national team at numerous levels. He represented the U-23 team at the 2004 Olympics, scoring the qualifying goal that took them there, and subsequently started three of four games for the team, scoring a goal against Portugal.

Saborío made his senior debut for Costa Rica in an October 2002 friendly match against Ecuador and has, as of June 2019, earned a total of 111 caps, scoring 36 goals, placing him third at his country's all-time goalscorers list behind Rolando Fonseca and Paulo Wanchope.

Saborío, better known as Pipe, has been notably recognized for his accomplishments with Deportivo Saprissa, and the high number of goals he scored in a short period. But after a year at the club his Costa Rican coach got a hold of him and he took part in the 2006 FIFA World Cup. He was mostly a substitute for the side, behind Rónald Gómez and former Manchestet City forward Paulo Wanchope. He also scored the first goal ever in the Estadio Nacional de Costa Rica, in the inaugural match against China. Saborío was at the centre of much controversy in the 2011 CONCACAF Gold Cup, criticized heavily for his misses, including two penalty kicks in the quarter-finals against Honduras, and for a training pitch incident where he allegedly kicked a ball at a child who was in the stands.

Saborío scored eight times in Costa Rica's successful 2014 FIFA World Cup qualification campaign, including a hat-trick in a 4–0 away win over Guyana on 12 June 2012, and a further two goals on 16 October in a 7–0 win over the same opponents. On 12 May 2014, Saborío was named to Costa Rica's 30-man preliminary roster for the 2014 FIFA World Cup in Brazil. However, on 29 May, the Costa Rican Football Federation confirmed that Saborío had broken the fifth metatarsal bone in his left foot during a training session with the national team and would subsequently miss the World Cup.

Saborío was in Costa Rica's squad for the 2015 CONCACAF Gold Cup, and earned his 100th cap on 11 July at the BBVA Compass Stadium in Houston, assisting Bryan Ruiz's goal in a 1–1 Group B draw with El Salvador; he was the fifth Costa Rican to make one hundred appearances.

Personal life
A son of former Costa Rica international Álvaro Grant MacDonald and Marlene Saborío, Saborío can speak four languages: Portuguese, Spanish, French and English.

Saborío holds a U.S. green card which qualifies him as a domestic player for MLS roster purposes.

Career statistics

Club

International goals
Scores and results list Costa Rica's goal tally first, score column indicates score after each Saborío goal.

Honours
Saprissa
Liga FPD: 2003–04, Apertura 2005, Clausura 2006
CONCACAF Champions League: 2005
Copa Interclubes UNCAF: 2003

Sion
Swiss Cup: 2009

Real Salt Lake
Major League Soccer Western Conference Championship: 2013

San Carlos
Liga FPD: Clausura 2019
Liga de Ascenso: 2017–18

Alajuelense
Liga FPD: Apertura 2020

Costa Rica
Copa Centroamericana: 2013

Individual
MLS Newcomer of the Year: 2010
 CONCACAF Gold Cup All-Tournament Team: 2009

See also
 List of footballers with 100 or more caps

References

External links
 
 

1982 births
Living people
People from San Carlos (canton)
Association football forwards
Costa Rican footballers
Costa Rica international footballers
Olympic footballers of Costa Rica
Footballers at the 2004 Summer Olympics
2004 Copa América players
2006 FIFA World Cup players
2007 CONCACAF Gold Cup players
2009 CONCACAF Gold Cup players
2011 CONCACAF Gold Cup players
2013 Copa Centroamericana players
2013 CONCACAF Gold Cup players
2015 CONCACAF Gold Cup players
Copa América Centenario players
Deportivo Saprissa players
FC Sion players
Bristol City F.C. players
Real Salt Lake players
D.C. United players
Swiss Super League players
English Football League players
Major League Soccer players
Costa Rican expatriate footballers
Expatriate footballers in Switzerland
Expatriate footballers in England
Expatriate soccer players in the United States
Costa Rican expatriate sportspeople in Switzerland
Costa Rican expatriate sportspeople in England
Costa Rican expatriate sportspeople in the United States
Designated Players (MLS)
Copa Centroamericana-winning players
FIFA Century Club
2019 CONCACAF Gold Cup players